Fakhr al-Dīn al-Rāzī or Fakhruddin Razi (1149 or 1150 – 1209), often known by the sobriquet Sultan of the Theologians, was an influential Muslim polymath and one of the pioneers of inductive logic. He wrote various works in the fields of medicine, chemistry, physics, astronomy, cosmology, literature, theology, ontology, philosophy, history and jurisprudence. He was one of the earliest proponents and skeptics that came up with the concept of multiverse, and compared it with the astronomical teachings of Quran. A rejector of the geocentric model and the Aristotelian notions of a single universe revolving around a single world, al-Razi argued about the existence of the outer space beyond the known world.

Al-Razi was born in Ray, Iran, and died in Herat, Afghanistan. He left a very rich corpus of philosophical and theological works that reveals influence from the works of Avicenna, Abu'l-Barakāt al-Baghdādī and al-Ghazali. 
Two of his works titled Mabāhith al-mashriqiyya fī ‘ilm al-ilāhiyyāt wa-'l-tabi‘iyyāt (Eastern Studies in Metaphysics and Physics) and al-Matālib al-‘Aliya (The Higher Issues) are usually regarded as his most important philosophical works.

Biography 
Fakhr al-Din al-Razi, whose full name was Abū ʿAbd Allāh Muḥammad ibn ʿUmar ibn al-Ḥusayn, was born in 1149 or 1150 CE (543 or 544 AH) in Ray (close to modern Tehran), whence his  al-Razi. According to Ibn al-Shaʿʿār al-Mawṣilī (died 1256), one of al-Razi's earliest biographers, his great-grandfather had been a rich merchant in Mecca. Either his great-grandfather or his grandfather migrated from Mecca to Tabaristan (a mountainous region located on the Caspian coast of northern Iran) in the 11th century, and some time after that the family settled in Ray. Having been born into a family of Meccan origin, al-Razi claimed descent from the first caliph Abu Bakr, and was known by medieval biographers as al-Qurashī (a member of the Quraysh, the tribe of the prophet Muhammad to which also Abu Bakr belonged). However, it's not clear from which precise lines of descent al-Razi envisioned his purported ties with Abu Bakr to result, and the poet Ibn ʿUnayn (died 1233) actually praised him as a descendant of the second caliph Umar ibn al-Khattab (died 644).

Fakhr al-Din first studied with his father, Ḍiyāʾ al-Dīn al-Makkī, himself a scholar of some repute whose magnum opus in kalam has recently been rediscovered in part, and later at Merv and Maragheh, where he was one of the pupils of Majd al-Din al-Jili, who in turn had been a disciple of al-Ghazali. He was a leading proponent of the Ash'ari school of theology.

His commentary on the Quran was the most-varied and many-sided of all extant works of the kind, comprising most of the material of importance that had previously appeared. He devoted himself to a wide range of studies and is said to have expended a large fortune on experiments in alchemy. He taught at Ray (Central Iran) and Ghazni (eastern Afghanistan), and became head of the university founded by Mohammed ibn Tukush at Herat (western Afghanistan).

In his later years, he also showed interest in mysticism, though this never formed a significant part of his thought. He died in Herat (Afghanistan) in 1209 (606 AH), where his tomb is still venerated today.

The Great Commentary

One of Imam Razi's outstanding achievements was his unique interpretive work on the Quran called Mafātiḥ al-Ghayb (Keys to the Unseen) and later nicknamed Tafsīr al-Kabīr (The Great Commentary), one reason being that it was 32 volumes in length. This work contains much of philosophical interest. One of his "major concerns was the self-sufficiency of the intellect." His "acknowledgment of the primacy of the Qur'an grew with his years." Al-Razi's rationalism undoubtedly "holds an important place in the debate in the Islamic tradition on the harmonization of reason and revelation."

Development of Kalam
Al-Razi's development of Kalam (Islamic scholastic theology) led to the evolution and flourishing of theology among Muslims. Razi had experienced different periods in his thinking, affected by the Ash'ari school of thought and later by al-Ghazali. Al-Razi tried to make use of elements of Muʿtazila and Falsafah, and although he had some criticisms on ibn Sina, Razi was greatly affected by him. The most important instance showing the synthesis of Razi's thought may be the problem of the eternity of the world and its relation to God. He tried to reorganize the arguments of theologians and philosophers on this subject, collected and critically examined the arguments of both sides. He considered, for the most part, the philosophers' argument for the world's eternity stronger than the theologians' position of putting emphasis on the temporal nature of the world. According to Tony Street, we should not see in Razi's theoretical life a journey from a young dialectician to a religious condition. It seems that he adopted different thoughts of diverse schools, such as those of Mutazilite and Asharite, in his exegesis, The Great Commentary.

Hypothetical concept of multiple universes 
Al-Razi, in dealing with his conception of physics and the physical world in his Matalib al-‘Aliya, criticizes the idea of the geocentric model within the universe and "explores the notion of the existence of a multiverse in the context of his commentary" on the Quranic verse, "All praise belongs to God, Lord of the Worlds." He raises the question of whether the term "worlds" in this verse refers to "multiple worlds within this single universe or cosmos, or to many other universes or a multiverse beyond this known universe."

Al-Razi states:

Al-Razi rejected the Aristotelian and Avicennian notions of a single universe revolving around a single world. He describes their main arguments against the existence of multiple worlds or universes, pointing out their weaknesses and refuting them. This rejection arose from his affirmation of atomism, as advocated by the Ash'ari school of Islamic theology, which entails the existence of vacant space in which the atoms move, combine and separate . He discussed more on the issue of the void – the empty spaces between stars and constellations in the universe, that contain few or no stars – in greater detail in volume 5 of the Matalib. He argued that there exists an infinite outer space beyond the known world, and that God has the power to fill the vacuum with an infinite number of universes.

List of works
Al-Razi had written over a hundred works on a wide variety of subjects. His major works include:
 Tafsir al-Kabir (The Great Commentary) (also known as Mafatih al-Ghayb)
 Asraar at-Tanzeel wa Anwaar at-Ta'weel (The Secrets of Revelation & The Lights of Interpretation). Tafsir of selected verses from The Quran.
Note: Not to be confused with the book of Tafsir by Imam Nasir al-Din al-Baydawi Qadi Baydawi called: Anwaar at-Tanzeel wa Asraar at-Ta'weel (The Lights of Revelation and The Secrets of Interpretation) or more commonly Tafsir al-Baydawi
 Asas al-Taqdis (The Foundation of Declaring Allah's Transcendence) Refutation of Ibn Khuzayma, the Karramites, and the Anthropomorphists
 ‘Aja’ib al-Qur’an (The Mysteries of the Qur'an)
 Al-Bayan wa al-Burhan fi al-Radd ‘ala Ahl al-Zaygh wa al-Tughyan
 Al-Mahsul fi ‘Ilm al-Usul
 Al-Muwakif fi ‘Ilm al-Kalam
 ‘Ilm al-Akhlaq (Science of Ethics)
 Kitab al-Firasa (Book on Firasa)
 Kitab al-Mantiq al-Kabir (Major Book on Logic)
 Kitab al-nafs wa’l-ruh wa sharh quwa-huma (Book on the Soul and the Spirit and their Faculties)
 Mabahith al-mashriqiyya fi ‘ilm al-ilahiyyat wa-’l-tabi‘iyyat (Eastern Studies in Metaphysics and Physics)
 Al-Matālib al-‘Āliyyah min al- 'ilm al-ilahī (The Higher Issues) – his last work. Al-Razi wrote al-Matālib during his writing of al-Tafsir and he died before completing both works.
  (The Harvest/Compendium of the Thought of the Ancients and Moderns)
 Nihayat al ‘Uqul fi Dirayat al-Usul
 Risala al-Huduth
 Sharh al-Isharat (Commentary on al-Isharat wa-al-Tanbihat of Ibn Sina)
 Sharh Asma' Allah al-Husna (Commentary on Asma' Allah al-Husna)
 Sharh Kulliyyat al-Qanun fi al-Tibb (Commentary on Canon of Medicine)
 Sharh Nisf al-Wajiz li'l-Ghazali (Commentary on Nisf al-Wajiz of Al-Ghazali )
 Sharh Uyun al-Hikmah (Commentary on Uyun al-Hikmah)
 ''Kitāb al-Arba'īn Fī Uṣūl al-Dīn'

See also 
 List of Ash'aris and Maturidis
 List of Muslim theologians
 List of Iranian scientists
 Astronomy in medieval Islam
 Cosmology in medieval Islam
 Abdol Hamid Khosro Shahi
 Nur al-Din al-Sabuni

References

Bibliography 
 (on his life and writings)

 (on his treatise on physiognomy)

 (on his astrological-magical writings)

External links 

 Muslimphilosophy.com: Fakhr al-Din al-Razi
 His biography
 Another Biography by GF Haddâd 

Asharis
Shafi'is
Shaykh al-Islāms
Mujaddid
12th-century Muslim theologians
Sunni imams
Sunni Muslim scholars of Islam
Quranic exegesis scholars
Islamic philosophers
12th-century Iranian scientists
13th-century Iranian scientists
People from Amol
Cosmologists
Medieval physicists
13th-century Persian-language writers
12th-century Persian-language writers
1150 births
1209 deaths
People from Ray, Iran
13th-century Muslim theologians
13th-century Iranian philosophers
Supporters of Ibn Arabi
12th-century Iranian philosophers